Q is the eighth studio album released by Mr. Children on September 27, 2000.

Since the beginning of their success in 1994, "Q" was the first album not to reach the #1 position because Ayumi Hamasaki outsold them by gapping 1 million copies in first week on the Oricon chart. It was also their lowest selling album since their first successful album, Atomic Heart.

Track listing
Center of universe
Sono mukou he ikou(Beyond the border)
Not Found
Slow starter
Surrender
Tsuyogari
12gatsu no Central Park blues
Tomo to coffee to uso to ibukuro
Road Movie
Everything is made from a dream
Kuchibue
Hallelujah
Yasurageru basho

2000 albums
Mr. Children albums
Albums produced by Takeshi Kobayashi
Japanese-language albums